Cascadilla School Boathouse is a historic boathouse located in Stewart Park, a municipal park operated by the City of Ithaca in Tompkins County, New York. The shingle style boathouse was built by the Cascadilla School from 1894 to 1896 as a structure to store boats and lies on the south end of Cayuga Lake. Crew rowing was extremely popular in the late 1800s, with the first World Rowing Federation annual international event taking place in 1893. The boathouse has been in continuous use for rowing storage, training, lessons, and meetings by the Cascadilla Boat Club. 

It was listed on the National Register of Historic Places in 1991. 

The Cascadilla Boat Club currently leases from the City of Ithaca the first floor of this historic structure for $46.17 per year in perpetuity. Continuing to use the boathouse for its original purpose, the club runs a competitive scholastic rowing program and youth and adult learn-to-row classes from April through October. Cascadilla Boat Club is a not-for-profit organization founded in 1977 with the mission of making the sport of rowing available to the entire Ithaca area community.

References

External links

Boathouses in the United States
Buildings and structures in Ithaca, New York
School buildings completed in 1896
Shingle Style architecture in New York (state)
National Register of Historic Places in Tompkins County, New York
Boathouses on the National Register of Historic Places
Transportation buildings and structures on the National Register of Historic Places in New York (state)